The Remington Naval Model 1865 is pistol designed by Joseph Rider and manufactured by Remington Arms since 1866 in .50 caliber.

History
Remington Arms Company provided the Remington Model 1865 pistol was part of a contract to manufacture approximately 6,500 rolling block pistols for the U.S. Navy between 1866 and 1870.

References

External links

Pistols of the United States
Remington Arms firearms
Guns of the American West